Prince Charles Thomas Albert Louis Joseph Constantine of Löwenstein-Wertheim-Rosenberg (18 July 1783 in Bartenstein (today part of Schrozberg) – 3 November 1849 in Heidelberg) was an Austrian officer during the Napoleonic Wars and from 1814 onwards, a member of the landless high nobility.

Background 
The noble  family dates back to the days of Elector Palatine Frederick the Victorious (1425–1476).  His children from his morganatic marriage with Clara Tott were not able to inherit the Wittelsbach properties, so they formed a separate noble family.  After the death of Count Louis III in 1611, the family was split into two main lines, the Protestant Löwenstein-Wertheim-Virneburg line (later Freudenberg) and the Catholic Löwenstein-Wertheim-Rochefort line.

Life 
Prince Charles Thomas was the first-born son from the marriage of Prince Dominic Constantine, Prince of Löwenstein-Wertheim-Rochefort (1762–1814) with Maria Leopoldine, Princess of Hohenlohe-Bartenstein (1761–1807).  Prince Charles had six sisters and three half siblings from his father's second marriage.  He and his younger brother Constantine were raised during the final years of the Holy Roman Empire.  They were very aware of the privileges of the class of Imperial Princes.  They were educated at court in Würzburg and later at the court of Prince Clemens Wenceslaus of Saxony, the Prince-Elector of Trier.  Nothing is known about any higher education that Charles Thomas may have enjoyed.  In 1802, he participated in a diplomatic mission of the Löwenstein-Wertheim-Rosenberg family to Paris.

His father's territory was mediatized during the events following the French Revolution.  The Löwenstein territories were divided between the newly elevated Grand Duchies of Baden and Hesse and the Kingdoms of Bavaria and Württemberg.  Charles Thomas joined the Austrian army and fought in several battles of the Napoleonic Wars.  Most recently, he served as major in the Galician Ulanes Regiment "Prince of Schwarzenberg" No. 2.  In 1812 and 1813, the family lost its territory on the left bank of the Rhine, including Rochefort.  This led to a name change: the House of Löwenstein-Wertheim-Rochefort changed its name to Löwenstein-Wertheim-Rosenberg.

In 1814, Charles Thomas's father died.  He resigned from the military and took up administration of the family possessions.  As a member of the high nobility, he held a seat in the First Chamber in Baden, Bavaria, Hesse and Württemberg.  However, he had little interest in the political issues of those four states.  Initially, his senior officials concerned themselves with the interests of the high nobility.  From the early 1830s, his son Constatine did the same.  After Constantine died in 1838, the senior officials took over again.  Throughout his life, Charles Thomas felt a strong bond with the Austrian Empire and its ruling Habsburg dynasty.  He married an Austrian wife and took up permanent residence in Vienna in the 1840s.  As he grew older, he devoted more and more time to his Catholic faith and developed a devotion, which served as a model for his grandson and successor Charles Henry.

Marriage and issue 
Thomas Charles married on 29 September 1799 in Ellwangen to Countess Sophie of Windisch-Grätz (1784–1848), a daughter of Count Joseph Nicholas of Windisch-Graetz.  They had the following children:
 Constantine (1802–1838), married to Princess Agnes of Hohenlohe-Langenburg (1804–1835);
 Marie Leopoldine, (1804–1869), married to her uncle, Prince Constantine of Löwenstein-Wertheim-Rosenberg (1786–1844);
 Marie Louise Adelaide Eulalia (1806–1884), married to Prince Camille of Rohan (1800–1892);
 Sophia Maria Theresa (1809–1838), married to Prince Heinrich XX of Reuss-Greiz;
 Maria Kreszentia Octavie (1813–1878), married to Prince Victor Alexander of Isenburg und Büdingen zu Birnstein;
 Aegidia Eulalie (1820–1895)

References 
 Frank Raberg: Biographisches Handbuch der württembergischen Landtagsabgeordneten 1815–1933, Kohlhammer Verlag, Stuttgart, 2001, p. 525
 Harald Stockert: Adel im Übergang. Die Fürsten und Grafen von Löwenstein-Wertheim zwischen Landesherrschaft und Standesherrschaft, Kohlhammer Verlag, Stuttgart, 2000,

External links 
Karl Thomas Ludwig Joseph Fürst zu

Footnotes 

Princes of Löwenstein-Wertheim-Rosenberg
Members of the Bavarian Reichsrat
1783 births
1849 deaths
19th-century German people
Knights of the Golden Fleece of Austria